Geran in Iran may refer to:
 Geran, Gilan (گران - Gerān)
 Geran, Hormozgan (گرن - Geran)
 Geran, Sistan and Baluchestan (گران - Gerān)